is a passenger railway station in the city of Tōon, Ehime Prefecture, Japan. It is on the Yokogawara Line, operated by Iyotetsu.

Lines
During most of the day, trains arrive every fifteen minutes. Trains continue from Matsuyama City Station on the Takahama Line to Takahama Station.

Layout
The station consists of a single side platform serving one bi-directional track. The station is staffed.

History
The station was opened on August 10, 1981. The station building was rebuilt in 2015.

Surrounding area
 Ehime University School of Medicine (Ehime University Shigenobu Campus)
Ehime University Hospital
Ehime Prefectural Toon High School
Ehime Prefectural Minara Special Needs School
National Hospital Organization Ehime Medical Center
Ehime Medical Center Nursing School

See also
 List of railway stations in Japan

References

External links

Iyotetsu Official station information

Iyotetsu Yokogawara Line
Railway stations in Ehime Prefecture
Railway stations in Japan opened in 1981
Tōon, Ehime